is a Japanese anime adaptation of The Tale of Genji. Originally, it was meant to be an anime adaptation of Waki Yamato's The Tale of Genji manga, but the director decided to make it a direct adaptation of the original tale. The character designs are still taken from Yamato's manga. The anime is directed by Osamu Dezaki. The series premiered on Fuji TV on January 15, 2009.

Anime
The series uses two pieces of theme music. The opening theme is "Hiyori Hime" by Puffy AmiYumi, while  by Kousuke Atari is the series' ending theme.

Soundtrack CDs
On February 25, 2009, Sony Music Entertainment released an animation soundtrack CD for Genji Monogatari Sennenki by S.E.N.S. Project and a single for the opening theme of Genji Monogatari Sennenki, "Hiyori Hime" by Puffy AmiYumi. On March 25, 2009, Sony Music Entertainment released a soundtrack CD for the ending theme of Genji Monogatari Sennenki, "Koi" by Kousuke Atari.

See also
List of characters from The Tale of Genji

References

External links

Official Genji Monogatari Sennenki website 

Romance anime and manga
Works based on The Tale of Genji
Noitamina
Tezuka Productions
TMS Entertainment